Walterson Silva (born 28 December 1995), simply known as Walterson, is a Brazilian footballer who plays for Moreirense F.C., as a forward.

Club career
Born in Janaúba, Minas Gerais, Walterson joined São Bernardo FC's youth setup in 2012 at the age of 17. The following year he was promoted to the first team, and made his senior debut on 3 August of that year by coming on as a half-time substitute in a 1–0 Copa Paulista home win against Juventus.

After being rarely used in the 2014 campaign, Walterson was loaned to Guarani de Divinópolis until the end of 2015 Campeonato Mineiro. He made seven appearances for the side, all from the bench, before returning to his parent club.

Walterson became a first team regular in 2016, contributing with 13 appearances and three goals. He scored his first goals on 26 March, netting a brace in a 4–1 away routing of Rio Claro.

On 4 May 2016, Walterson was loaned to Santos until the end of the year, being initially assigned to the B-team. He made his first team – and Série A – debut on 8 September, replacing Vitor Bueno in a 1–2 away loss against Internacional.

On 23 December 2016, after failing to reach an agreement, Walterson was released by Peixe and returned to his parent club. The following 7 April, he was loaned to fellow top tier club Atlético Goianiense until the end of the year.

On 14 April 2018, after playing the Campeonato Paulista in Santo André, he was announced in São Bento for Campeonato Brasileiro Série B.

Career statistics

References

External links

1994 births
Living people
Sportspeople from Minas Gerais
Brazilian footballers
Association football forwards
Campeonato Brasileiro Série A players
Campeonato Brasileiro Série B players
São Bernardo Futebol Clube players
Santos FC players
Atlético Clube Goianiense players
Figueirense FC players
Esporte Clube Santo André players
Esporte Clube São Bento players
Primeira Liga players
Liga Portugal 2 players
F.C. Famalicão players
Moreirense F.C. players
Brazilian expatriate footballers
Brazilian expatriate sportspeople in Portugal
Expatriate footballers in Portugal